Gerónimo Gastón Poblete (born 2 January 1993) is an Argentine professional footballer who plays as a defensive midfielder for Al-Wasl.

Career
Poblete started his senior career in 2011 with Argentine Primera División side Colón, he was an unused substitute four times during the 2011–12 season. He made his professional debut on 16 February 2014 in a game against Argentinos Juniors. In his next appearance versus Argentinos Juniors, in September 2014, Poblete scored his first goal for Colón in a 0–2 win. In total, Poblete made seventy-three appearances and scored two goals in his first six seasons with Colón, twenty of those appearances and one of those goals fell during the club's 2014 season in Primera B Nacional following relegation in 2013–14 to the country's second tier.

On 4 July 2017, after one hundred and seven appearances for Colón, Poblete departed to France to join Ligue 1 club Metz. He joined on a free transfer and signed a four-year contract. Poblete's Ligue 1 debut came on 5 August versus Guingamp, he played the full match in a 1–3 defeat. On 11 August 2018, San Lorenzo loaned Poblete. Twenty-two appearances followed in 2018–19. Poblete left San Lorenzo on 30 June 2019, but returned on a fresh loan deal on 21 July. He made another twenty-two appearances. Poblete returned to Metz in June 2020, subsequently featuring twice for their reserve team in Championnat National 2.

Poblete terminated his Metz contract on 29 October, prior to returning to South America with Chilean Primera División team Deportes La Serena. He made his debut on 15 November in a home win over Huachipato, which preceded fifteen further appearances in 2020 as the club finished fifteenth; avoiding the relegation play-off due to goal difference and relegation itself by one point. On 19 February 2021, Poblete went back to his homeland with Vélez Sarsfield.

Career statistics
.

References

External links

1993 births
Living people
Sportspeople from Mendoza Province
Argentine sportspeople of Chilean descent
Argentine footballers
Argentine expatriate footballers
Expatriate footballers in France
Expatriate footballers in Chile
Expatriate footballers in Ukraine
Expatriate footballers in the United Arab Emirates
Argentine expatriate sportspeople in France
Argentine expatriate sportspeople in Chile
Argentine expatriate sportspeople in Ukraine
Argentine expatriate sportspeople in the United Arab Emirates
Association football midfielders
Argentine Primera División players
Primera Nacional players
Ligue 1 players
Ligue 2 players
Chilean Primera División players
UAE Pro League players
Club Atlético Colón footballers
FC Metz players
San Lorenzo de Almagro footballers
Deportes La Serena footballers
Club Atlético Vélez Sarsfield footballers
Club Atlético Independiente footballers
Al-Wasl F.C. players
FC Metalist Kharkiv players